EHC Dortmund Die Elche (Elks) was an ice hockey team in Dortmund, Germany. The club was founded in 1996 after the financial collapse of the Club ERC Dortmund 1990.

Other Clubs at Dortmund 
EV Westfalen Dortmund: 1936 - 1940
TuS Eintracht Dortmund - Department Eishockey: 1956 - 1965
ERC Westfalen Dortmund: 1964 - 1990
ERC Westfalen Dortmund 1990: 1990 - 1996
Eisadler Dortmund: 2013 -

Achievements
Regionalliga champion : 2008, 2009.

External links
 Official site

Ice hockey teams in Germany
Ice hockey clubs established in 1996